North Mankato is a city in Nicollet and Blue Earth counties in the State of Minnesota.  The population was 14,275 at the 2020 census.

Most of North Mankato is in Nicollet County, but a small part extends into Blue Earth County. It is neighbored to the south across the Minnesota River by Mankato. The two cities have a combined population of 58,763. North Mankato is the smaller of the two principal cities of the Mankato-North Mankato Metropolitan Statistical Area.

North Mankato was incorporated as a village in 1898. U.S. Highways 14 and 169 and Minnesota State Highway 60 are three of the city's main routes.

Geography

Demographics

2010 census
As of the census of 2010, there were 13,394 people, 5,580 households, and 3,553 families living in the city. The racial makeup of the city was 93.9% White, 2.1% African American, 0.2% Native American, 1.7% Asian, 0.8% from other races, and 1.3% from two or more races. Hispanic or Latino of any race were 3.0% of the population.

There were 5,580 households, of which 31.2% had children under the age of 18 living with them, 50.0% were married couples living together, 9.8% had a female householder with no husband present, 3.9% had a male householder with no wife present, and 36.3% were non-families. 27.6% of all households were made up of individuals, and 9.2% had someone living alone who was 65 years of age or older. The average household size was 2.39 and the average family size was 2.92.

The median age in the city was 35.5 years. 23.7% of residents were under the age of 18; 10.1% were between the ages of 18 and 24; 27.8% were from 25 to 44; 26.3% were from 45 to 64; and 11.9% were 65 years of age or older. The gender makeup of the city was 49.3% male and 50.7% female.

2000 census
As of the census of 2000, there were 11,798 people, 4,744 households, and 3,178 families living in the city. The racial makeup of the city was 96.47% White, 0.65% African American, 0.24% Native American, 1.38% Asian, 0.03% Pacific Islander, 0.44% from other races, and 0.79% from two or more races. Hispanic or Latino of any race were 1.59% of the population.

There were 4,744 households, out of which 35.7% had children under the age of 18 living with them, 55.0% were married couples living together, 9.0% had a female householder with no husband present, and 33.0% were non-families. 24.7% of all households were made up of individuals, and 7.3% had someone living alone who was 65 years of age or older.  The average household size was 2.48 and the average family size was 2.99.

In the city, the population was spread out, with 26.3% under the age of 18, 10.9% from 18 to 24, 30.6% from 25 to 44, 22.5% from 45 to 64, and 9.6% who were 65 years of age or older.  The median age was 33 years. For every 100 females, there were 96.1 males.  For every 100 females age 18 and over, there were 93.1 males.

The median income for a household in the city was $48,816, and the median income for a family was $59,265. Males had a median income of $38,720 versus $25,713 for females. The per capita income for the city was $23,916.  About 5.3% of families and 7.0% of the population were below the poverty line, including 7.8% of those under age 18 and 7.2% of those age 65 or over.

Politics

Education

Hoover Elementary School
Monroe Elementary School
Roosevelt Elementary School
Kennedy Elementary School
Prairie Winds Middle School
Dakota Meadows Middle School 
South Central College

Corporations
 Angie's Artisan Treats
 Taylor Corporation

References

External links
North Mankato's Home Page

Cities in Minnesota
Cities in Nicollet County, Minnesota
Cities in Blue Earth County, Minnesota
Mankato – North Mankato metropolitan area